Local elections were held in the United Kingdom in 1994. The results showed a continued decline for the governing Conservatives (now in their 15th successive year of government at Westminster), with the third placed party, the Liberal Democrats, as the main beneficiaries.

The main opposition, the Labour Party, gained 44 seats, bringing their number of councillors to 9,257. Their projected national vote share was 40%, a 1% increase on the 1993 local elections. The Conservative Party lost 516 seats and were left with 7,286 councillors. Their projected national vote share was 27%, a 4% fall since the previous local elections in 1993. The Liberal Democrats gained 428 seats and had 4,551 councillors after the elections. The Liberals received a 27% share of the national vote, a 2% increase on 1993.

This was the last election to be contested by Labour Leader John Smith; he would die less than a week after the local elections.

Summary of results

England

London boroughs

In all 32 London boroughs the whole council was up for election.

Metropolitan boroughs
All 36 metropolitan borough councils had one third of their seats up for election.

District councils
In 114 districts one third of the council was up for election.

These were the last elections to the district councils of Bristol, Hartlepool, Kingston upon Hull and York before they were made unitary authorities by the Local Government Commission for England (1992).

These were also the last elections to the district councils of Bath, Great Grimsby and Scunthorpe before they were abolished and replaced by unitary authorities by the Local Government Commission for England (1992).

Scotland

Regional councils

Apart from Orkney, Shetland and Western Isles, these were the last elections to the regional councils before they were abolished by the Local Government etc. (Scotland) Act 1994.

References

Local elections 2006. House of Commons Library Research Paper 06/26.
Vote 1999 BBC News
Vote 2000 BBC News